The Spencer–Penn School is a historic school complex at 30 George Taylor Road in Spencer, Virginia.  Its main building, a large brick Colonial Revival building, was built in 1926–27, and is the only surviving non-residential building in the community to be built before World War II.  The campus also includes the school's first building, a frame structure built in 1911.  The school served the area until 2004, when it was closed by the county school board.  The campus is now home to the Spencer–Penn Centre, a non-profit education and special event center.

The property was listed on the National Register of Historic Places in 2005.

See also
National Register of Historic Places listings in Henry County, Virginia

References

External links
The Spencer–Penn Centre web site

National Register of Historic Places in Henry County, Virginia
Colonial Revival architecture in Virginia
School buildings completed in 1926
Buildings and structures in Henry County, Virginia
1926 establishments in Virginia